Brian Bowen II (born October 2, 1998) is an American professional basketball player for the Iowa Wolves of the NBA G League. He originally committed to play college basketball for the Louisville Cardinals but was suspended by the team after a national college basketball corruption scandal which alleged that his family accepted payments in exchange for his choice to attend Louisville. He later tried to play for the South Carolina Gamecocks, but due to an NCAA ruling, he removed himself from college and the 2018 NBA draft altogether. Nicknamed "Tugs", he was named a McDonald's All-American as a senior in high school in 2017.

High school career 

Bowen played at Arthur Hill High School in Saginaw, Michigan, before transferring to La Lumiere School in La Porte, Indiana, in 2015. He had three points in the 2017 McDonald's All-American Boys Game. As a senior at La Lumiere, he had averaged 22 points per contest, while leading his team to a national championship at the Dick's Sporting Goods high school tournament. In the 2017 Jordan Brand Classic, he scored a game high 26 points, including 6-of-7 from beyond the arc, and was named co-MVP.

College recruiting
Bowen was the last five-star recruit in the class of 2017 to announce his college commitment. It was announced on June 3, 2017, that he would be enrolling at Louisville. He reportedly also had offers from Michigan State, Arizona, UCLA, Oregon, Texas, DePaul and Creighton on the table. In September 2017, a Federal Bureau of Investigation investigative report into a college basketball corruption scandal made an ostensibly anonymous reference to alleged payments to the family of a student-athlete named only as "Player-10" who was recruited by an institution named only as "University-6". That university was described in such a way that it could only have been the University of Louisville. Player-10's signing was reportedly announced on or about June 3, 2017, and Bowen was the only Louisville player whose signing was in fact announced on or about that day.

At the end of the summer, he enrolled in classes and began participating in preseason team activities as scheduled. On September 27, 2017, Louisville coach Rick Pitino and athletic director Tom Jurich were placed on administrative leave, and eventually dismissed. On the same day, Bowen was also suspended from all team activities, but he continued to be enrolled in the school and he still had his scholarship.  On November 3, 2017, Bowen was cleared by the FBI. On November 22, 2017, Louisville announced that Bowen will not play or practice for the team. Academically, he was still a student in good standing at the time. On January 10, 2018, University of South Carolina coach Frank Martin announced that Bowen had enrolled at the university and would join the Gamecocks' basketball program.  The university anticipated that Bowen would have to sit out the next two semesters, due to NCAA transfer regulations, meaning he would be able to begin playing within January 2019. However, on April 18, 2018, Bowen announced his intentions on entering the 2018 NBA Draft, with him later being one of 69 players to enter that year's NBA Draft Combine. He would do so without hiring an agent, meaning he originally planned to return properly, but only if his confirmation on his transfer would be approved by the May 30 deadline. However, by that point in time, he had heard from the NCAA that he would have been forced to sit out for at least another season due to the combination of alleged benefits that were given to his family back when he committed to Louisville and his transfer soon afterward to South Carolina. As a result, he officially announced his entry for the 2018 NBA Draft that day instead of returning to college. However, on the June 11 international deadline, Bowen announced his withdrawal from the 2018 draft, which would allow him to either play in the NBA G League or overseas professionally before potentially returning in a future NBA Draft.

Professional career

Sydney Kings (2018–2019)
After withdrawing from the 2018 NBA draft during the final entry deadline, Bowen made the decision to forgo college and pursue a professional contract. On August 7, 2018, Bowen signed with the Sydney Kings of the Australian NBL. During the 2018–19 NBL season, he played in 30 games while averaging 6.3 points and 3.2 rebounds per game. At the season's end, Bowen became automatically eligible for the 2019 NBA draft.

Indiana Pacers (2019–2021)
Bowen was not selected in the 2019 NBA draft. On July 1, 2019, Bowen signed a two-way contract with the Indiana Pacers and their G League affiliate, the Fort Wayne Mad Ants. Bowen averaged 16.1 points and 7.7 rebounds per game in the G League. On November 29, 2020, the Indiana Pacers announced that they had re-signed with Bowen to a two-way contract. On April 23, 2021, the Pacers waived Bowen. Bowen later filed a lawsuit at the United States District Court for the District of South Carolina against Adidas and others who he claimed derailed his NBA career, but the case was dismissed on May 26, 2021.

Iowa Wolves (2021–2022)
On September 20, 2021, Bowen signed with the Minnesota Timberwolves. However, he was waived prior to the start of the season. On October 26, he signed with the Iowa Wolves as an affiliate player. On March 10, 2022, he was waived.

Career statistics

NBA

|-
| style="text-align:left;"| 
| style="text-align:left;"| Indiana
| 6||1|| 5.2|| .300||.000||— || 1.2|| .0|| .0|| .2 || 1.0
|-
| style="text-align:left;"| 
| style="text-align:left;"| Indiana
| 6||0|| 2.5|| .250|| .000||1.000|| .5|| .0||  .0|| .0|| .5
|- class="sortbottom"
| style="text-align:center;" colspan="2"| Career
|12|| 1|| 3.8|| .286|| .000|| 1.000|| .8|| .0|| .0|| .1|| .8

NBL

|-
| align="left" | 2018–19
| align="left" | Sydney
| 28 || 3 || 15.5|| .462|| .351|| .788 || 3.0|| .6|| .3|| .1|| 6.5
|- class="sortbottom"
| style="text-align:center;" colspan="2"| Career
| 28 || 3 || 15.5|| .462|| .351|| .788 || 3.0|| .6|| .3|| .1|| 6.5

References

External links 

 
 ESPN profile
 MaxPreps profile
 Scout.com profile

1998 births
Living people
21st-century African-American sportspeople
African-American basketball players
American expatriate basketball people in Australia
American men's basketball players
Basketball players from Michigan
Fort Wayne Mad Ants players
Indiana Pacers players
Iowa Wolves players
La Lumiere School alumni
McDonald's High School All-Americans
Shooting guards
Small forwards
Sportspeople from Saginaw, Michigan
Sydney Kings players
Undrafted National Basketball Association players
United States men's national basketball team players